Microbacterium kitamiense is a heterotrophic, strictly aerobic, mesophilic and non-motile bacterium from the genus Microbacterium which has been isolated from waste water from a sugar-beet factory in Kitami in Japan. Microbacterium kitamiense produces polysaccharide. Microbacterium kitamiense has a high GC-content.

References

Further reading

External links
Type strain of Microbacterium kitamiense at BacDive -  the Bacterial Diversity Metadatabase	

Bacteria described in 1999
kitamiense